Eder Ricardo Steer Lara (Born June 8, 1982) is a Colombian professional football player who currently plays for Jaguares de Córdoba.

Career
He used to play for Independiente Medellín in Colombia and Municipal Pérez Zeledón, Brujas F.C. in Costa Rica. Steer was one of the most successful foreign players to appear for Pérez Zeledón.

On 25 July 2009, he signed an 18-month contract with Changchun Yatai. He played 14 games and scored 7 goals in Season 2009.

References

External links

1982 births
Living people
Colombian footballers
Independiente Medellín footballers
Municipal Pérez Zeledón footballers
Brujas FC players
Changchun Yatai F.C. players
Guangdong Sunray Cave players
Zhejiang Yiteng F.C. players
Colombian expatriate footballers
Expatriate footballers in China
Expatriate footballers in Costa Rica
Colombian expatriate sportspeople in China
Categoría Primera A players
Chinese Super League players
China League One players
Association football forwards
People from Valledupar